Indian Path  is part of the Riverport District, a community in the Canadian province of Nova Scotia, in Lunenburg County.

Much of the rural infrastructure for Bayport is centered in Riverport, Nova Scotia. This includes the Riverport & District Fire Department, Riverport & District Community Center, Riverport Community School and Riverport Post Office. Rose Bay General Store offers a wide range of locally based goods and services.

External links
Riverport District  (archived copy)

Communities in Lunenburg County, Nova Scotia
General Service Areas in Nova Scotia